The Hit List is a 2011 American action thriller film directed by William Kaufman. The film stars Cuba Gooding Jr., with a supporting cast of Cole Hauser, Jonathan LaPaglia and Ginny Weirick. The film was released on direct-to-DVD in the United States on May 10, 2011.

Plot
Allan Campbell (Cole Hauser), a man who has had a very bad day, goes to a bar to drown his sorrows. He drunkenly befriends a mysterious man who calls himself Jonas Arbor (Cuba Gooding Jr.), revealing to him a list of five people he wishes were dead. But as the bodies start piling up, and with a detective (Jonathan LaPaglia) hot on his trail, Allan, no longer believing the events to be a practical joke, must set out to end the murders before it is too late for his wife, who happens to be the last on the list.

Cast
 Cuba Gooding Jr. as Jonas Arbor
 Cole Hauser as Allan Campbell
 Jonathan LaPaglia as Detective Neil McKay
 Ginny Weirick as Sydney Campbell
 Sean Cook as Brian Felzner
 Drew Waters as Mike Dodd
 Michael Papajohn as Agent Drake Ford
 Brandon O'Neill as Dom Estacado
 J.P. O'Shaughnessy as Lieutenant Ben Harp
 David Andriole as Detective Ray Lowery
 Harrison Seaborn also as Jail Inmate #3

Production
Actor Christian Slater, who also starred with Cuba Gooding Jr. in Lies & Illusions as well as Sacrifice, was originally rumored to play the part of Allan Campbell. Slater co-starred with Hauser in the film Shadows of the White Nights.

The writers of Hero Wanted, and also starring Cuba Gooding, Jr., penned the screenplay, while several of the producers of Hero Wanted, End Game, and Wrong Turn at Tahoe produced.

Director William Kaufman of the 2005 indie action thriller The Prodigy was chosen to direct.

Filming took place in Spokane, Washington in early 2010. The local police in Spokane refused to officially participate in the film's production because of the film's depiction of violence toward police officers. This is due to the 2009 shooting of Lakewood, Washington, police officers, which occurred two months before principal photography began.

Home media
DVD was released in Region 2 in the United Kingdom on 9 May 2011, and also Region 1 in the United States on May 10, 2011, it was distributed by Sony Pictures Home Entertainment.

References

External links
 
 

2011 films
2011 action thriller films
2011 direct-to-video films
2011 psychological thriller films
American action thriller films
American psychological thriller films
Direct-to-video action films
Films about contract killing
Films set in Los Angeles
Films shot in Washington (state)
Sony Pictures direct-to-video films
Stage 6 Films films
2010s English-language films
Films directed by William Kaufman
2010s American films